Rowlands is a former Rochester Industrial and Rapid Transit Railway loop and station located in Brighton, New York. It was closed in 1956 along with the rest of the line.  The station was named after local property owner Elwell Rowland. The Rochester and Eastern Rapid Railway connected to the Subway at Rowlands after 1927, abandoning their line up Monroe Avenue to the city line.

References

External links

Buildings and structures in Brighton, Monroe County, New York
Rochester Subway stations
Railway stations in the United States opened in 1918
Railway stations closed in 1956
1918 establishments in New York (state)
1956 disestablishments in New York (state)